The 1998 Croatian Indoors was a men's tennis tournament played on indoor carpet courts in Split, Croatia, that was part of the World Series of the 1998 ATP Tour. It was the only edition of the tournament and was held from 2 February to 9 February 1998. Second-seeded Goran Ivanišević won the singles title.

Finals

Singles

  Goran Ivanišević defeated  Greg Rusedski, 7–6(7–3), 7–6(7–5)

Doubles

  Martin Damm /  Jiří Novák defeated  Fredrik Bergh /  Patrik Fredriksson, 7–6, 6–2

References

External links
 ITF tournament edition details

Croatian Indoors
1998
Sport in Split, Croatia
1998 in Croatian tennis
February 1998 sports events in Europe